Michael Mercer (born November 21, 1935) is a former American football kicker and punter who played for six teams from (1961–1970). In the American Football League, he played for the Oakland Raiders, the Kansas City Chiefs and the Buffalo Bills.  He was a member of the Chiefs' 1966 AFL Championship team that played in the first AFL-NFL World Championship Game.

Mercer's 9 yard field goal attempt was blocked by Larry "Wildman" Eisenhauer and recovered by Don Webb, with about 3 minutes left, in the Oakland Raiders 43-43 tie with the Boston Patriots on October 16, 1964. On December 22, 1963 Mercer kicked a 4th quarter 39 yard field goal to break a 49-49 tie with the Oilers and give the Raiders a 52-49 win. In that same game Mercer was 7 for 7 on extra points. Mercer led the Raiders in scoring in 1964 with 79 points, hitting 15 field goals and all 34 extra point attempts.

See also
 List of American Football League players

References

1935 births
Living people
American Football League All-Star players
American Football League players
American football placekickers
American football punters
Buffalo Bills players
Green Bay Packers players
Kansas City Chiefs players
Minnesota Vikings players
Northern Arizona Lumberjacks football players
Oakland Raiders players
People from Algona, Iowa
Players of American football from Iowa
San Diego Chargers players